The Dornier Do 13 was a short-lived 1930s German bomber design. It was the designation given to the aircraft resulting from attempts to improve on the Do 11. However, only a few were built, because the design changes caused serious problems, with many of the first flights ending in crashes. Another redesign ensued, resulting in the Do 23 and Do 13s under construction were converted to the Do 23 design.

Variants
Do 13c : Initial production version.
Do 13d : Improved version.

See also

References

 

Abandoned military aircraft projects of Germany
Do 013
1930s German bomber aircraft